The Peru–Chile Trench, also known as the Atacama Trench, is an oceanic trench in the eastern Pacific Ocean, about  off the coast of Peru and Chile.

The trench delineates the boundary between the subducting Nazca Plate and the overriding South American Plate.

Geology
The trench is a result of a convergent plate boundary, where the eastern edge of the oceanic Nazca Plate is being subducted beneath the continental South American Plate. The trench is also a part of the Chile Triple Junction, an unusual junction that consists of a mid-oceanic ridge and the Chile Rise being subducted under the South American plate at the Peru-Chile Trench. Two seamount ridges within the Nazca Plate enter the subduction zone along this trench: the Nazca Ridge and the Juan Fernández Ridge.

Sediments are mainly turbidites interspersed with oceanic deposits of clay, volcanic ash, and siliceous ooze.

The Peru–Chile Trench, the forearc and the western edge of the central Andean plateau (Altiplano), delineate the dramatic "Bolivian Orocline" that defines the Andean slope of southern Peru, northern Chile, and Bolivia.

Oceanography
Most of the time, the trade winds drive surface waters offshore near the equator, driving the Humboldt Current from the tip of southern Chile to northern Peru. This current is associated with upwelling of deep, nutrient-rich water off the coast of Peru. At times, El Niño disrupts the usual wind pattern and lessens the upwelling. The consequent loss of nutrient causes fish kills.

Biology 
In 2018, three new species of snailfish were discovered thriving in the depths of the Atacama Trench.

Associated seismicity

The subduction of the Nazca Plate below the South American Plate along the Chile-Peru Trench is associated with numerous earthquakes. Several of these earthquakes are notable for their size, associated tsunamis, and landslides.
1570 Concepcion earthquake: Mw ~8.3
1687 Peru earthquake: Mw ~8.7
1730 Valparaíso earthquake Ms ~8.7
1746 Lima–Callao earthquake: Mw ~8.7
1868 Arica earthquake: Mw ~9.0
1877 Offshore Tarapaca, Peru: Mw ~8.3
1906 Valparaíso earthquake
1942 Peru earthquake: Mw 8.2 event associated with a tsunami, the rupture dimensions and epicenter are similar to those of a 1996 earthquake
1960 Valdivia earthquake: At Mw 9.5, the largest earthquake ever recorded on the earth
November 1960 Peru earthquake: This event had a long source duration, leading to a significant discrepancy between different moment calculation methods ( 6.75 vs  7.8) 
1970 Ancash earthquake: This Mw7.9 event triggered a landslide with large snow and ice components, killing ~68,000 people
2001 southern Peru earthquake: Mw 8.4
2005 Tarapacá earthquake
2007 Tocopilla earthquake
2007 Peru earthquake: Mw 8.0
2010 Chile earthquake: Mw 8.8 event associated with a tsunami
2010 Pichilemu earthquake
2014 Iquique earthquake
2015 Illapel earthquake

See also 
Oceanic trench
Pacific Ring of Fire

References

Geology of Chile
Geology of Peru
Landforms of Chile
Landforms of Peru
Lowest points of the World Ocean
Natural history of South America
Oceanic trenches of the Pacific Ocean
Subduction zones